Bruce Marchiano (born February 5, 1956) is an American actor and author best known for his portrayals of Jesus Christ in the Visual Bible film series.

Early life
Marchiano was born in Los Angeles, California on February 5, 1956. His father is of Italian descent and his mother is of Syrian descent and he has one brother. He attended Catholic school until graduating. A Dustin Hoffman film he saw in theaters when he was young inspired him to be an actor and he acted throughout high school. 

Marchiano earned his B.A. in economics from California State University, Fullerton and a J.D. degree from Western State University. He passed the State Bar of California in 1980 but only actively practiced law in 2019.

Career

Acting career
Marchiano's first role was a 1985 episode of Murder, She Wrote, which was followed by appearances in LA Law, Columbo, and the low-budget horror film, Curse II: The Bite.

As of 2021, he has played Jesus in at least ten films; Higher Level Agency claims he has appeared as Jesus in more movies than any other actor. In the 2009 film Road to Emmaus, he portrayed Jesus' mysterious post-resurrection appearance to two disciples as described in the Gospel of Luke. He also voiced an animated Jesus in the children's animation Lion of Judah. In 2012, Marchiano portrayed Jesus in Apostle Peter and the Last Supper, a film about St. Peter recalling his early days as he prepares for his martyrdom in Rome. In 2014 he appeared as Jesus in The Week that Changed the World.

Writing career
Marchiano has written four books, mostly about his experiences portraying Jesus:
 In the Footsteps of Jesus: One Man’s Journey (1997), Harvest House
 Jesus, the Man Who Loved Women: He Treasures, Esteems, and Delights in You (2008), Howard Books
 The Character of a Man: Reflecting the Image of Jesus (2010), Howard Books
 Jesus Wept (2012), Howard Books

He also wrote, directed, and appeared in the pro-life film Alison's Choice

Marchiano Ministries
Marchiano runs Marchiano Ministries, a non-profit ministry based out of North Hollywood, California that goes on missionary trips to South Africa. He has given talks at schools and churches since 1993.

Personal life
Marchiano grew up in the Catholic Church but became a Protestant in 1989. He and his wife Maria have two children, Shane and Brooke.

Filmography

Films

Television

References

External links

 https://web.archive.org/web/20071030094648/http://www.vineyardboise.org/publications/articles/2000/quarter_2/bruce.htm
 https://archive.today/20070106002437/http://www.gospelaccordingtojohn.com/text/biography.htm
 http://www.brucemarchiano.com/

1956 births
Living people
American male film actors
American people of Italian descent
American people of Syrian descent
Male actors from Los Angeles
California State University, Fullerton alumni
Western State University College of Law alumni